The 2016 Ricoh Open was a tennis tournament played on outdoor grass courts. It was the 27th edition of the Rosmalen Grass Court Championships, and part of the 250 Series of the 2016 ATP World Tour, and of the WTA International tournaments of the 2016 WTA Tour. Both the men's and the women's events took place at the Autotron park in Rosmalen, 's-Hertogenbosch in the Netherlands, from 6 June through 12 June 2016. Nicolas Mahut and CoCo Vandeweghe won the singles titles.

ATP singles main-draw entrants

Seeds

 1 Rankings are as of May 23, 2016.

Other entrants
The following players received wildcards into the main draw:
  Stefan Kozlov
  Nicolas Mahut
  Igor Sijsling

The following players received entry from the qualifying draw:
  Ernesto Escobedo
  Lukáš Lacko
  Daniil Medvedev
  Dennis Novikov

Withdrawals
Before the tournament
  Pablo Carreño Busta →replaced by  David Ferrer
  Alexandr Dolgopolov →replaced by   Rajeev Ram
  Richard Gasquet →replaced by  Ivan Dodig
  David Goffin →replaced by   Adrian Mannarino
  João Sousa →replaced by  Dudi Sela
  Fernando Verdasco →replaced by  Horacio Zeballos
  Alexander Zverev →replaced by  Benjamin Becker

ATP doubles main-draw entrants

Seeds

1 Rankings are as of May 23, 2016.

Other entrants
The following pairs received wildcards into the doubles main draw:
  Guillermo García López /  Robin Haase
  Matt Reid /  Bernard Tomic

Withdrawals
During the tournament
  Ivan Dodig (illness)

WTA singles main-draw entrants

Seeds

 1 Rankings are as of May 23, 2016.

Other entrants
The following players received wildcards into the main draw:
  Indy de Vroome
  Dalma Gálfi
  Richèl Hogenkamp

The following players received entry from the qualifying draw:
  Viktorija Golubic
  Eri Hozumi
  Jovana Jakšić
  Irina Khromacheva
  Elise Mertens
  Risa Ozaki

The following player received entry as a lucky loser:
  Aleksandra Krunić

Withdrawals
Before the tournament
  Tímea Babos → replaced by  Mirjana Lučić-Baroni
  Annika Beck → replaced by  Aleksandra Krunić
  Camila Giorgi → replaced by  Kateryna Kozlova
  Anastasia Pavlyuchenkova → replaced by  Polona Hercog
  Barbora Strýcová → replaced by  Yaroslava Shvedova

WTA doubles main-draw entrants

Seeds

1 Rankings are as of May 23, 2016.

Champions

Men's singles

  Nicolas Mahut def.  Gilles Müller, 6–4, 6–4

Women's singles

  CoCo Vandeweghe def.  Kristina Mladenovic 7–5, 7–5

Men's doubles

  Mate Pavić /  Michael Venus def.  Dominic Inglot /  Raven Klaasen, 3–6, 6–3, [11–9]

Women's doubles

  Oksana Kalashnikova /  Yaroslava Shvedova def.  Xenia Knoll /  Aleksandra Krunić, 6–1, 6–1

References

External links 
 

Ricoh Open
Ricoh Open
Ricoh Open
Rosmalen Grass Court Championships